Hiltrud Gürtler (born 12 February 1957) is a German rower. She competed in the women's eight event at the 1976 Summer Olympics.

References

External links
 

1957 births
Living people
German female rowers
Olympic rowers of West Germany
Rowers at the 1976 Summer Olympics
Sportspeople from Neuss